Yusuf Kalkavan Anatolian High School (abbreviated Y.K.A.L) is a Turkish public high school in Mersin. The school admits their students based on the Nationwide High School Entrance score. The education languages are Turkish, English and German. YKAL was opened in 1992 in the region of Mezitli.

See also
 List of high schools in Turkey

References

 General Information About Turkish Educational System Including Anatolian High Schools 
 Law About Anatolian High Schools 

Buildings and structures in Mersin
Educational institutions established in 1992
1992 establishments in Turkey
High schools in Mersin
Anatolian High Schools